Gerdab-e Piazi (also Romanized as Gerdāb-e Pīāzī; also known as Khorshevā, Par-e Ja‘far, and Par-i-Ja‘far) is a village in Mishan Rural District, Mahvarmilani District, Mamasani County, Fars Province, Iran. At the 2006 census, its population was 70, in 13 families.

References 

Populated places in Mamasani County